"80's Ladies" is a song written and recorded by American country music artist K. T. Oslin.  It was released in April 1987 as the second single and title track from Oslin's album 80's Ladies.  The song reached number 7 on the Billboard Hot Country Singles & Tracks chart.  It won Song of the Year at the 1988 CMA Awards.

Music video
A video for the song was released in 1988 and directed by Michael Merriman. The video starts off with a group of couples getting together and leaving, as Oslin's character tells her husband that she was going to stay the night at her friend's house, where her and a friend are watching old films on a projection screen reminiscing about the past. The friends later drive to the cemetery, where it is revealed their longtime friend, who was in the films had recently died and the couples at the start of the film were together for a memorial service.

Charts

References

1987 singles
K. T. Oslin songs
Song recordings produced by Harold Shedd
RCA Records Nashville singles
Songs written by K. T. Oslin
Music videos directed by John Lloyd Miller
1987 songs